Agency Township is one of twelve townships in Buchanan County, Missouri, USA.  As of the 2010 census, its population was 1,213.

The first settlement at Agency Township was made in 1837.

Geography
It contains two cemeteries: Karns and Pine.

Millers Lake is within this township. The streams of Pigeon Creek and Rock Creek run through this township.

References

External links
 US-Counties.com
 City-Data.com
 USGS Geographic Names Information System (GNIS)

Townships in Buchanan County, Missouri
Townships in Missouri